Pearl Street Films was an American film and television production company based at Warner Bros. Studios.

History 
Matt Damon and Ben Affleck established the company, and Jennifer Todd became a president in October 2012. In March 2018, the company announced that it would adopt inclusion riders for all future projects. It was dissolved in November 2022 as Affleck and Damon focused on founding their independent production company called "Artists Equity".

Filmography

Film

Television

Accolades 

Pearl Street Films has received numerous nominations and awards for their productions.

References

American companies established in 2012
American companies disestablished in 2022
Defunct American film studios
Entertainment companies established in 2012
Entertainment companies disestablished in 2022
Film production companies of the United States
Matt Damon
Ben Affleck